Jón Páll Sigmarsson (28 April 1960 – 16 January 1993) was an Icelandic strongman, powerlifter and bodybuilder who was the first man to win the World's Strongest Man four times and the first and only man to win the World Muscle Power Classic five times. He is widely regarded as one of the greatest strongmen of all time, and is credited with developing Iceland's national identity. He was named Icelandic Sportsperson of the Year in 1981, and was one of the best-known Icelandic athletes. In 2012, Jón Páll was inducted into the World's Strongest Man Hall of Fame.

Early life
He was the first child of Dóra Jónsdóttir and Sigmar Jónsson. He was raised by his mother and foster father Sveinn Guðmundsson. The family moved to Stykkishólmur when he was two. He remained there until the age of nine, when the family relocated to Reykjavík. Growing up, he spent his summers on Skáleyjar and was active as a farmhand. He worked from dawn until dusk, carrying pails of water and assisting his foster father on seal hunts. He took up Glima, a traditional Icelandic form of wrestling, at the age of five and later played football and handball, as well as competing in swimming, middle-distance running, and karate.

Career
Jón Páll was introduced to weight lifting in 1976, and began training at Jakaból in 1978.
In 1984 he won the Icelandic bodybuilding title in the +90 kg. class.

Jón Páll was invited to the World's Strongest Man competition for the first time in 1983, in which he came in second only to Geoff Capes. The following year, at age 24, he defeated Capes and secured the title. During the final armwrestling event, in which Jón Páll was up against him, Capes appeared to be winning, pulling Jón Páll's arm down convincingly, but sustained a muscle tear in his forearm as Jón Páll started to thrust his arm back. Right after winning the bout, Jón Páll shouted "The King has lost his crown!" and won his first World's Strongest Man title in 1984. Although Jón Páll was closely defeated by Capes at the 1985 World's Strongest Man, he managed to regain the title in 1986. During the deadlift event at the 1985 World's Strongest Man competition, someone in the audience called him an Eskimo. Jón Páll shouted back: "I am not an Eskimo. I am a Viking!" and successfully lifted the  cart.

In 1986, Jón Páll first wrestled English author and Guinness World Record Holder Brian Sterling-Vete in a demonstration match for the TV news and print media held at Finnur Karlsson's gymnasium in Reykjavík, Iceland. Halfway through the match Jón and Sterling had plotted to surprise the audience with a supposed angry outburst leading to the two of them demonstrating their skills as martial artists. This showmanship became synonymous with both Jón Páll and Sterling.

In 1987, Jón Páll clashed with his arguably greatest rival - 3 times World's Strongest Man winner Bill Kazmaier of Burlington, Wisconsin, USA, who had not been invited to compete at World's Strongest Man again after winning the competition 3 times in a row from 1980 to 1982.

At Pure Strength 1987, a competition held in place of the absent World's Strongest Man competition of that year on the grounds of Huntly Castle in Aberdeenshire, Scotland, Geoff Capes, Bill Kazmaier and Jón Páll matched up to crown the strongest man on the planet. Jón Páll, being in the shape of his life, won the contest convincingly by winning 8 out of 10 events and even managed to beat Kazmaier, who was making his comeback into the strongman sport after having worked and travelled as a professional wrestler.

At the 1988 World's Strongest Man the two rivals clashed again. As expected Kazmaier dominated the static events while Jón Páll, who had shed body-weight to cater for all the dynamic tests of strength of World's Strongest Man instead of the latter statically orientated events of Pure Strength 1987, was often victorious in the more athletic, speed- and endurance-oriented events. Although Jón Páll was beaten by Kazmaier in the deadlift, log lift and sack race, he managed to win the "weight over the bar event" and the McGlashen Stones in the end to secure the overall victory and to become the World's Strongest Man for the third time, equaling Kazmaier's record. After his victory Jón Páll said: "I may be the fastest strongman in the world, but I think Bill [Kazmaier] is the strongest on his feet."

After a disappointing third place at the 1989 World's Strongest Man, Jón Páll was able to win the competition, while injured, for a record breaking fourth time in 1990.

After battling with the injuries sustained during 1988, 1989, and 1990, which had affected his athleticism, his strength became progressively more static in his later years. Jón Páll was often challenged by fellow competitor Bill Kazmaier in feats of statically oriented events between contests because he believed the events were biased in Jón Páll's favour. This included Kaz challenging Jón Páll to a sledgehammer hold during Pure Strength 1987 where Jón Páll beat Kazmaier.

The 1990 World's Strongest Man proved to be Jón Páll's last appearance on the World's Strongest Man stage, as he was surpassed as the Icelandic number one by fellow countryman Magnús Ver Magnússon, who won the Iceland's Strongest Man title in 1988 and 1989 and continued Sigmarsson's legacy by emulating his 4 World's Strongest Man title wins during the 90's.

Personal life and death
Although he was known for his energetic and boastful personality when competing, Jón Páll was a soft-spoken and bookish man in his personal life. Jón Páll had one son, Sigmar Freyr (born 1983).

On 16 January 1993, Jón Páll died of an aortic rupture while deadlifting in his gym, Gym 80 in Reykjavík. This was likely the result of a congenital heart defect that affected other members of his family, which may have been exacerbated by his use of anabolic steroids. He had sought medical treatment in the United States the previous year due to heart problems. In Sölvi Tryggvason's 2013 biography of Jón Páll he stated he suspected Jón Páll knew he was close to death.

Hjalti Árnason, a lifelong friend of Jón Páll's, created the Jón Páll Sigmarsson Classic international strongman contest in 2010 in honor of Jón Páll. The event is held annually during the Icelandic fitness & health expo in Reykjavík, the inaugural winner was America's Brian Shaw in 2010 and the final winner was Iceland's very own Hafþór Júlíus Björnsson in 2012.

Jón Páll was described in his life documentary "Larger than Life" by one of his former rivals Geoff Capes as "a new kind of guy on the block" and by David Webster equally in describing him as a man who boasted pure static strength as well as versatile athletic strength in all its forms, a combination that lead to his supreme performances. World's Strongest Man Director Colin Bryce called Jón Páll the greatest strongman of all time for not only his titles but also showmanship, stating "Strongman is entertainment. None of us would be here without Jón Páll".

Personal records

Powerlifting competition records:

done in official powerlifting meets
 Squat -  raw in 1984
 Equipped bench press -  in early prototype bench shirt
 Raw bench press -  raw in 1984
 Deadlift -  raw in 1984
 Total - 

* former European deadlift record in 1984

Strongman records:
  Rectangular-handled wheel deadlift -  - Pure Strength 1987, a strongman world record in 1987.
  Ox-cart deadlift -  - World's Strongest Man 1985
  Silver dollar deadlift (18 inches with wrist straps) -  - World's Strongest Man 1983
  Single hand deadlift (Raw without wrist straps) - 
 Log lift -  - Iceland's Strongest Man 1987, a strongman world record in 1987.
 Rock press - 
 Wheel-barrow push -  for 3.06 m
He also achieved world records in the Claymore Lift, McGlashen Stones and the Cannon Pull during Pure Strength 1987. He was also the first man ever to load a  McGlashen stone and got into the Guinness Book of Records for lifting the world's largest whiskey bottle.

Training bests:

 Bench press -  raw.
 Deadlift -  raw as an exhibition lift in 1986.
 Deadlift -  with wrist straps as an exhibition lift.
 Squat -  raw.

Competition history

Strongman
World's Strongest Man
1983 - 2nd
1984 - 1st
1985 - 2nd
1986 - 1st
1988 - 1st
1989 - 3rd
1990 - 1st
World Muscle Power Championship
1985 - 1st
1986 - 1st
1987 - 2nd
1988 - 3rd
1989 - 1st
1990 - 1st
1991 - 1st
Europe's Strongest Man
1983 - 3rd
1985 - 1st
1986 - 1st
1987 - 3rd
1988 - 2nd
1989 - 3rd
1990 - 4th
1992 - 4th
Other contests
1982 Scandinavian Strongest Man - 1st
1985 Le Defi Mark Ten (Canada) - 3rd
1986 Le Defi Mark Ten (Canada) - 2nd
1987 Le Defi Mark Ten (Canada) - 5th
1987 Japan Grand Prix - 2nd
1987 Pure Strength - 1st
1989 Corby Great Eccleston (England) - 1st
1989 Iceland's Kraftur Contest - 1st
1990 Nissan Power Cup - 1st
1990 European Muscle Power Championship
1991 European Hercules - 2nd
1992 European Hercules - 6th
Iceland's Strongest Man winner - 1985, 1986, 1987, 1990, 1992
Finland's Strongest Man winner - 1989
Finnish nationals winner - 1992

Powerlifting
1980 European Powerlifting Championships - 2nd
1981 European Powerlifting Championships - 2nd
1981 World Powerlifting Championships - 3rd
1983 European Powerlifting Championships - 1st

Olympic weightlifting
1980 Icelandic Olympic weightlifting Championships - 1st

Highland games
1986 Carmunnock Highland Games (Scotland) - 7th
1986 Commonwealth Highland Games (Scotland) - 1st

Notes

References

External links

Official website (archived)
Jón Páll Sigmarsson - The Viking Warrior

Sigmarsson, Jón Páll
Sigmarsson, Jón Páll
People from Hafnarfjörður
Icelandic strength athletes
Icelandic powerlifters
Icelandic male weightlifters
Sport deaths in Iceland
20th-century Icelandic people